All Is as All Should Be is an EP by American progressive rock band The Dear Hunter, released on December 1, 2017 via Cave and Canary Goods.

The official announcement was made on the band's social networks and website, where Casey thanked the fans for their unconditional support and explained what the EP was all about:

The tracks from this EP were recorded in different places, in old fan houses and closer to the band.

On October 27, 2017, the track "The Right Wrong" was released through streaming platforms and on the band's YouTube channel.

PopMatters said it was consistent with their prior releases, calling it "remarkable."

It reached 13 as a peak position on the Independent Albums Billboard chart on December 23, 2017.

Track listing

Personnel
The Dear Hunter  
Casey Crescenzo – Lead Vocals, Guitar, Bass guitar, Keyboards  
Nick Crescenzo – Drums, Percussion, Backing Vocals  
Maxwell Tousseau – Guitar, Keyboards, Percussion, Backing Vocals  
Robert Parr – Guitar, Keyboards, Backing Vocals  
Nick Sollecito – Bass guitar  
Gavin Castleton – Keyboards, Backing Vocals

References 

The Dear Hunter albums
2017 EPs